The Gingerbread Man is a stop motion animated children's television series about a gingerbread man and his friends, who come to life in their kitchen home when the Big Ones are asleep.

The series was written by David Wood, adapted from his two-act musical play The Gingerbread Man, which premiered in 1976 at the Towngate Theatre in Basildon, Essex, and went on to great international success. The play is inspired by "The Gingerbread Man", a 19th-century fairy tale.

The screen adaptation was co-produced by FilmFair and Central Independent Television in 1991, and broadcast on ITV in 1992. Andrew Sachs voiced the Gingerbread Man, Mr Salt the Sailor, Herr Von Cuckoo and Sleek The Mouse. Jacqueline Clarke voiced Miss Pepper and Old Tea Bag. Although uncredited, Anton Rodgers voiced the narrator.

Characters and Voice Cast

 The Gingerbread Man (voiced by Andrew Sachs) - The title character who lives on the kitchen dresser with his friends.
 Mr Salt (voiced by Andrew Sachs) - A male sailor-like salt grinder who references sailing activities whenever he is woken up.
 Miss Pepper (voiced by Jacqueline Clarke) - A female pepper grinder who frequently asks Mr Salt to twist her grinder.
 Herr Von Cuckoo (voiced by Andrew Sachs) - A German wooden Cuckoo from the kitchen's Cuckoo Clock who makes cuckoo sounds every hour.
 Old Tea Bag (voiced by Jacqueline Clarke) - A female bad-tempered old tea bag who lives in the teapot on the top shelf on the kitchen dresser.
 Sleek The Mouse (voiced by Andrew Sachs) - A hungry gangster with a Brooklyn accent.
 The Big Ones - Two humans who live in the house with the Gingerbread Man. They are heard, but are never seen on screen.

Episodes

 "The Arrival"
 "Herr Von Cuckoo's Cuckoo"
 "Sleek the Mouse"
 "Hide and Squeak"
 "Poison"
 "Party"
 "A Pinch of Salt"
 "Locked Clock"
 "Weekend Break"
 "Old Tea Bag in Danger"
 "While the Cat's Away"
 "It's Not Fair"
 "The Gingerbread Ghost"

Home Media releases

In the United Kingdom, some episodes were released on VHS tapes in the 1990s by PolyGram Video, 4 Front Video (Pocket Money Video) and distributed by Channel 5..  For example, PolyGram Video released a VHS tape with the first 5 episodes on 28 April 1995. Various animation compilations on VHS included single episodes.

After including a portion of the series on its VHS animation compilation All Together Now (2001), Universal Studios Home Entertainment  released the first 5 episodes on a Region 2 DVD entitled The Gingerbread Man (12 April 2004), again distributed by PolyGram Video and Channel 5.  The entire series was finally issued on DVD when Abbey Home Media released the first 6 episodes on DVD on 27 March 2006, and the remaining seven episodes on a second DVD on 26 March 2007.

Notes

External links

1990s British children's television series
1992 British television series debuts
1992 British television series endings
British children's animated fantasy television series
ITV children's television shows
English-language television shows
British stop-motion animated television series
Television series by FilmFair
Television series by DHX Media
Television series based on plays
Television shows based on fairy tales
Television shows produced by Central Independent Television
1990s British animated television series